Asus Memo Pad ME172V is a low-end, budget Android tablet manufactured by Taiwanese corporation Asus. The tablet was announced and released in January 2013. At $149 (launch price) it was $50 cheaper than its competitors, the Google Nexus 7 and Amazon Kindle Fire HD, but critical design flaws led to poor ratings.

Specifications
The device runs the operating system Android 4.1.1 (codename: Jelly Bean). Features of the tablet include a 7-inch IPS LCD display, 1 GHz single-core ARM Cortex-A9 processor, 1 GB of RAM and 1 MP front-facing camera. The tablet has approximately a 7-hour battery life.

Reception
PC Magazine compared the Asus to the Amazon Kindle Fire as a "solid alternative" but would not recommend the tablet for more than surfing the web and reading books. Disappointing battery life also hurt the tablets ratings. 
CNET also rated the Asus poorly, citing system crashes while playing games, poor battery life and is uncomfortable to hold.

References

External links
Official Website

Android (operating system) devices
Asus products
Portable media players
Tablet computers